The 1946 New York Yankees season was the team's 44th season. The team finished with a record of 87–67, finishing 17 games behind the Boston Red Sox. New York was managed by Joe McCarthy, Bill Dickey, and Johnny Neun. The Yankees played at Yankee Stadium.

Offseason 
 Prior to 1946 season: Frank Verdi was signed as an amateur free agent by the Yankees.

Regular season 
On May 24, Joe McCarthy, who had managed the team since 1931 and led them to seven World Championships, resigned. Although he had been in ill health, there were also underlying issues with team executive Larry MacPhail and frustrations with the team's performance, especially that of pitcher Joe Page, with whom he had an argument the previous day on the team plane. Long-time Yankee catcher Bill Dickey took over the team. Dickey himself resigned on September 12, and coach Johnny Neun finished out the year at the helm.

Season standings

Record vs. opponents

Notable transactions 
 June 17, 1946: Frank Colman was purchased by the Yankees from the Pittsburgh Pirates.

Roster

Player stats

Batting

Starters by position 
Note: Pos = Position; G = Games played; AB = At bats; H = Hits; Avg. = Batting average; HR = Home runs; RBI = Runs batted in

Other batters 
Note: G = Games played; AB = At bats; H = Hits; Avg. = Batting average; HR = Home runs; RBI = Runs batted in

Pitching

Starting pitchers 
Note: G = Games pitched; IP = Innings pitched; W = Wins; L = Losses; ERA = Earned run average; SO = Strikeouts

Other pitchers 
Note: G = Games pitched; IP = Innings pitched; W = Wins; L = Losses; ERA = Earned run average; SO = Strikeouts

Relief pitchers 
Note: G = Games pitched; W = Wins; L = Losses; SV = Saves; ERA = Earned run average; SO = Strikeouts

Farm system 

LEAGUE CHAMPIONS: Augusta

References

External links
1946 New York Yankees at Baseball Reference
1946 New York Yankees team page at www.baseball-almanac.com

New York Yankees seasons
New York Yankees
New York Yankees
1940s in the Bronx